Ahtone is a Kiowa surname. Notable people with the surname include:

 Heather Ahtone, Choctaw/Chickasaw museum curator
 Sharron Ahtone Harjo, Kiowa painter and educator
 Tahnee Ahtoneharjo-Growingthunder, also known as Tahnee Ahtone, Kiowa/ Muscogee/Seminole curator, museum director, and beadwork artist

Native American surnames